Mariia Pinchuk (born 7 April 2006) is a Ukrainian ice dancer. With her skating partner, Mykyta Pogorielov, she is the 2022 JGP Latvia bronze medalist, a two-time Ukrainian junior national champion (2021, 2022), and competed in the final segment at the 2022 World Junior Figure Skating Championships.

Personal life 
Pinchuk was born on 7 April 2006 in Kharkiv, Ukraine. Pinchuk and her mother fled Kharkiv during the 2022 Russian invasion of Ukraine and have lived in Austria since mid-March 2022. Her father, sister, and grandparents remain in Ukraine.

Programs

With Pogorielov

Competitive highlights 
JGP: Junior Grand Prix

With Pogorielov

References

External links 
 

2006 births
Living people
Ukrainian female ice dancers
Sportspeople from Kharkiv